Adamkiewicz is a Polish surname. Its Russified form is Adamkevich, Lithuanized: Adamkevičius.

People with this surname include:

 Albert Wojciech Adamkiewicz (1850–1921), Polish pathologist
 Edmund Adamkiewicz (1920–1991), German footballer
Patrycja Adamkiewicz, Polish taekwondo athlete

See also

Polish-language surnames